This is a list of bishops and patriarchs of Aquileia in northeastern Italy. For the ecclesiastical history of the diocese, see Patriarchate of Aquileia.

From 553 until 698 the archbishops renounced Papal authority as part of the Schism of the Three Chapters and when they returned to the Roman fold they maintained the title patriarch which was adopted during this schism.

The Patriarchs gained the Countship of Friuli and the March of Carniola in 1077 and the March of Istria in 1209. The temporal authority of the patriarchate was lost on 7 July 1420 when its territories were secularized by Venice.

The Patriarchate was dissolved in 1751 and its ecclesiastical authority divided between the Archbishop of Gorizia (Görz) and the Archbishop of Udine.

Bishops of Aquileia, c. 50–355 
 Saint Mark - founder of community
 Hermagoras (c. 50–70), Protoepiscopus (first bishop)
 ...
 Hilarius of Aquileia or of Panonia c. 276–285, beheaded in the persecutions of Numerian
 Chrysogonus I c. 286–295
 Chrysogonus II c. 295–308
 Theodore c. 308–319
 Agapitus c. 319–332
 Benedictus c. 332–?
 Viator c. 339-340
 Fortunatianus c. 343–355

Archbishops of Aquileia, 355–557 
 Valerianus 369–388
 Chromatius 388–407
 Augustinus 407–434
 Adelphus 434–442
 Maximus I 442–444
 Januarius 444–447
 Secundus 451–452
 Nicetas 454–485
 Marcellianus 485–500
 Marcellinus 500–513/21?
 Stephen I 515/521?–534
 Laurentius, 534-539

Patriarchs of Aquileia, 539–606 
 Macedonius 539–556
 Paulinus I 557–569
 Probinus 569–570
 Elia 571–586
 Severus 586–606

Schism, 607–698

Patriarchs of Old Aquileia 
 John I 606
 Marcianus 623–628
 Fortunatus 628–663, moved episcopal residence to Cormons
 Felix 649–?
 John II 663–?
 Agathon 679–680 or 679–?
 John III 680–?

Patriarchs of Grado
 Candidianus 606–612
 Epiphanius 612–613
 Ciprianus 613–627
 Primogenius 630–648
 Maximus II 649
 Stephen II 670–?
 Christophoros 685–?

Patriarchs of Aquileia 

 Petrus I 698–700, at the Council of Pavia (698) restored Communion with the Pope
 Serenus 711–723
 Calixtus 726–734, moved episcopal residence to Cividale
 vacant or unknown 734–772
 Siguald 772–776
 Paulinus II 776–802
 Ursus I 802–811
 Maxentius 811–833
 Andreas 834–844
 Venantius 850–?
 Theutmar 855–?
 Lupus I 855–?
 Valpert 875–899
 Frederick I 901–922
 Leo 922–927
 Ursus II 928–931
 Lupus II 932–944
 Engelfred 944–963
 Rodoald 963–984
 John IV of Ravenna 984–1017
 Poppo 1019–1042, also known as Wolfgang
 Eberhard 1045–1049
 Gotebald 1049–1063
 Ravengerius 1063–1068
 Sigehard 1068–1077
 Henry 1077–1084
 Svatobor (Friedrich) of Bohemia 1084–1085
 Frederick II of Bohemia 1085–1086
 Ulrich I of Eppenstein 1086–1121
 Gerard I 1122–1128
 Pellegrino I of Ortenbourg 1130–1161
 Ulrich II of Treven 1161–1181
 Godfrey 1182–1194
 Pellegrino II of Ortenburg-Sponheim 1195–1204
 Wolfgar of Leibrechtskirchen 1204–1218
 Berthold of Merania 1218–1251, moved episcopal see to Udine
 Gregorio of Montelongo 1251–1269
 Philip of Spanheim 1269–1273
 Raimondo della Torre 1273–1299
 Pietro Gerra 1299–1301
 Ottobuono di Razzi 1302–1315
 Gillo of Villalta 1315–1316
 Cassono della Torre 1316–1318
 Pagano della Torre 1319–1332
 Bertram of St. Genesius 1334–1350
 Nicholas of Luxemburg 1350–1358
 Lodovico della Torre 1359–1365
 Marquard of Randeck 1365–1381
 Philip II of Alençon 1381–1387
 John of Moravia 1387–1394
 Antonio I Caetani 1394–1402
 Antonio II Panciera 1402–1412
 Antonio III da Ponte 1409–1418 (1409–1412 opposite patriarch)
 Louis of Teck 1412–1435 (Ludovico II or Ludwig II of Teck)
 Ludovico Trevisan 1439–1465
 Marco I Barbo 1465–1491
 Ermolaio I Barbaro 1491–1493
 Niccolò II Donati 1493–1497
 Domenico Grimani 1498–1517
 Marino Grimani 1517–1529
 Marco II Grimani 1529–1533
 Marino Grimani (2nd time) 1533–1545
 Giovanni VI Grimani 1545–1574
 Daniele I Barbaro, coadjutor 1550–1570
 Aloisio Giustiniani 1570–1585
 Giovanni VI Grimani (2nd time) 1585–1593
 Francesco Barbaro 1593–1616
 Ermolaio II Barbaro 1616–1622
 Antonio IV Grimani 1622–1628
 Agostino Gradenigo 1628–1629
 Marco III Gradenigo 1629–1656
 Gerolamo Gradenigo 1656–1657
 Giovanni VII Dolfino 1657–1699
 Dionisio Dolfino 1699–1734
 Daniel II Cardinal Dolfino 1734–1751 (became Archbishop of Udine from 1752–1762)

Patriarchal See divided between the Archdiocese of Udine and the Archdiocese of Gorizia in 1752.

Titular archbishops

See also 
 Aquileian rite
 Councils of Aquileia

References

External links 
 The Patriarchate of Aquileia by GCatholic 

Lists of bishops
 
 
Patriarchate of Aquileia
Lists of patriarchs
Italy religion-related lists